John Sherrod (September 10, 1924 – July 10, 2004) was an American meteorologist and information scientist.

Biography 
John Sherrod was born on September 10, 1924 in Kane, Pennsylvania. 

Sherrod received a B.S. in mathematics from Allegheny College, Meadville, Pa., in 1947 and then a B.S. and M.S. in meteorology from Pennsylvania State College, where he remained as instructor and research meteorologist until 1952.

He then worked at the Library of Congress as head of the Snow, Ice, and Permafrost (SIPRE) Bibliography Project in the former Technical Information Division. He was promoted in April 1956 to acting chief of the Science Division, and was appointed chief a year later.

In March 1963 Sherrod was appointed chief of the Information Services and Systems Branch, Division of Technical Information (renamed Science and Technology in 1958) at the U. S. Atomic Energy Commission which was later merged in the US Department of Energy .As Deputy Director of Technical Information at the US Department of Energy, he was instrumental in establishing the Nuclear Energy Information System (INIS).

Sherrod was appointed Director of the National Agricultural Library (NAL) in 1968.  During his tenure as there from  1968 to 1973,  he led the development of the International Agricultural  System (AGRIS) under the aegis of the United Nations.

Following his government career,  Sherrod worked for many years as a senior consultant to Aspen Systems Corporation in Rockville, MD., He also taught graduate information science courses at Drexel and Rutgers Universities, and authored and edited   publications on scientific and technical information.  

Sherrod served in the US Navy during World War II, retiring as a Lt. Commander. 

Sherrod was elected President of the American Society for Information Science in 1970,

Sherrod died on 10 July 2004 in Pittsboro, North Carolina; he is buried at Arlington National Cemetery.

References 

1924 births
2004 deaths
Information scientists
Librarians at the Library of Congress
United States Department of Agriculture officials
Allegheny College alumni
Penn State College of Earth and Mineral Sciences alumni
Drexel University faculty
Burials at Arlington National Cemetery
20th-century American naval officers
Scientists from Pennsylvania